Hancock Township is one of twenty-four townships in Hancock County, Illinois, USA.  As of the 2010 census, its population was 255 and it contained 129 housing units.  It was formed from Fountain Green and St. Mary's townships on April 27, 1855.

Geography

Unincorporated towns
 Joetta at 
(This list is based on USGS data and may include former settlements.)

Cemeteries
The township contains these five cemeteries: Liberty, Majorville, Oak Grove, Spangler and Yetter.

Major highways
  U.S. Route 136
  Illinois Route 336

Demographics

School districts
 LaHarpe Elementary School District #347 (North side of Township)
 Carthage Elementary School District #317 (Southwest side/ Central of Township)
 West Prairie Community Unit School District #103 (West side of Township)

Political districts
 Illinois's 18th congressional district
 State House District 94
 State Senate District 47

References
 United States Census Bureau 2008 TIGER/Line Shapefiles
 
 United States National Atlas

External links
 City-Data.com
 Illinois State Archives
 Township Officials of Illinois

Townships in Hancock County, Illinois
Townships in Illinois